Lutipri was the father of the Urartian king Sarduri I. 

Lutipri may have ruled Urartu between 844 and 834 BCE, in a period of obscurity after the destruction of the former capital Arzashkun by Shalmaneser III, and before Sarduri's foundation of the new capital at Tushpa.

As Sarduri I may have established a new dynasty, it is possible that his father, Lutipri, was not actually a king of  Urartu.

Attestation
An inscription, in Assyrian cuneiform, on a small fortification west of the citadel of Tushpa, mentions his son as builder of a wall, and it is likely that he is in fact the founder of the town.
The inscription reads:

References

See also

List of kings of Urartu

Urartian kings
9th-century BC rulers